The Theodul Glacier (also spelled Theodule Glacier; ,) is a glacier of the Alps, located south of Zermatt in the canton of Valais. It lies on the Swiss side of the Pennine Alps, although its upper basin touches the Italian region of the Aosta Valley. Both branches are part of the Rhone basin, through the rivers Gornera, Mattervispa, and Vispa. Slightly above the glacier splitting is the Theodul Pass, crossing the border between Switzerland and Italy, and connecting Zermatt to Breuil-Cervinia. On the west, the Theodul Glacier is overlooked by the Matterhorn.

Until about 1980s the Lower Theodul Glacier was still connected to the Gorner Glacier and one of its tributaries.

The upper section of the Theodul Glacier consists of a flat plateau at around 3,800 metres, named Breithorn Plateau. The plateau lies between the Breithorn, the Gobba di Rollin and the Klein Matterhorn. The Breithorn Pass (3,814 m) separates the Breithorn from the Gobba di Rollin. A 3,795 m high saddle lies between the Gobba di Rollin and the Klein Matterhorn. Between the Klein Matterhorn and the Breithorn is a distinct glacier, named Klein Matterhorn Gletscher, which joins the Lower Theodul Glacier at about 3,000 metres. The Breithorn Plateau area can be easily accessed by several cable cars connecting Zermatt to the Klein Matterhorn.

At around 3,500 metres is the Plateau Rosa, whose name derives from the Valdôtain patois term Rouése, meaning "ice" (as for the nearby Monte Rosa). This area lies between Testa Grigia (3,479 m) and the Klein Matterhorn, south of and slightly above the Theodul Pass. Southeast of Testa Grigia is a saddle named Passo di Ventina Nord (3,445 m). This area can also be easily accessed by several cable cars connecting Breuil-Cervinia to Testa Grigia.

Most of the glacier is part of the year-round ski area marketed as Matterhorn Glacier Paradise. It is the highest in Europe and largest summer ski area in the world, with 21 kilometres of prepared pistes. The culminating point is on the summit of Gobba di Rollin and the lowest is above Trockener Steg. The Matterhorn Glacier Paradise links the ski areas of Zermatt and Breuil-Cervina. Ski lifts connect Trockener Steg, Theodul Pass, Testa Grigia, Klein Matterhorn and Gobba di Rollin. A chair lift also connects Trockener Steg to the Furggsattel (3,349 m), north of the Theodul Pass.

Several lakes recently formed at the bottom of the Upper Theodul Glacier, west of Trockener Steg. The largest, named Theodulgletschersee is 7.76 ha wide and lies at an elevation of 2,851 metres above sea level. It is the highest lake over 4 ha in Switzerland and the largest lake in the Matter Valley (the valley of Zermatt). The second-largest, named Furggsee is 2.57 ha wide and lies at 2,874 metres.

Climate
The Theodul Glacier has an alpine climate (Koppen: ET)

References

Swisstopo topographic maps (1:25,000)

External links

Glaciers of Valais
Glaciers of the Alps
Skiing in the Alps
Skiing in Switzerland